General Conesa is a town in Buenos Aires Province, Argentina. It is the head town of the Tordillo Partido.

External links

Populated places in Buenos Aires Province
Populated places established in 1839
1839 establishments in Argentina